Alfredo James Pacino (born April 25, 1940) is an American actor. Considered one of the greatest and most influential actors of the 20th century, he has received numerous accolades: including an Academy Award, two Tony Awards, and two Primetime Emmy Awards, making him one of the few performers to have achieved the Triple Crown of Acting. He has also been honored with the Cecil B. DeMille Award in 2001, the AFI Life Achievement Award in 2007, the National Medal of Arts in 2011, and the Kennedy Center Honors in 2016.

A method actor, he studied at HB Studio and the Actors Studio, where he was taught by Charlie Laughton and Lee Strasberg. Pacino went on to receive the Academy Award for Best Actor for his role in Scent of a Woman (1992). His other Oscar-nominated roles include The Godfather (1972), Serpico (1973), The Godfather Part II (1974), Dog Day Afternoon (1975), and ...And Justice for All (1979), Dick Tracy (1990), Glengarry Glen Ross (1992), and The Irishman (2019). Other notable films include The Panic in Needle Park (1971), Author! Author! (1982), Scarface (1983), The Godfather Part III (1990), Carlito's Way (1993), Heat (1995), Donnie Brasco (1997), The Devil's Advocate (1997), The Insider (1999), Insomnia (2002), Jack and Jill (2011), Once Upon a Time in Hollywood (2019) and House of Gucci (2021).

On television, Pacino has acted in several productions for HBO, including Angels in America (2003) and the Jack Kevorkian biopic You Don't Know Jack (2010), winning a Primetime Emmy Award for Outstanding Lead Actor in a Miniseries or a Movie for each. Pacino starred in the Amazon Video series Hunters (2020–2023). He has also had an extensive career on stage. He is a two-time Tony Award winner, winning Best Featured Actor in a Play in Does a Tiger Wear a Necktie? (1969) and Best Actor in a Play for The Basic Training of Pavlo Hummel (1977).

Pacino made his filmmaking debut with the documentary Looking for Richard (1996); Pacino had played the lead role on stage in 1977. He has also acted as Shylock in a 2004 feature film adaptation and 2010 stage production of The Merchant of Venice. Pacino directed and starred in Chinese Coffee (2000), Wilde Salomé (2011), and Salomé (2013). Since 1994, he has been the joint president of the Actors Studio.

Early life 
Alfredo James Pacino was born in the East Harlem neighborhood of Manhattan, New York City, on April 25, 1940, the only child of Sicilian Italian-American parents Rose Gerardi and Salvatore Pacino. His parents divorced when he was two years old. He then moved with his mother to the South Bronx to live with her parents, Kate and James Gerardi, who were Italian emigrants from Corleone. Pacino's father was from San Fratello and moved to work as an insurance salesman and restaurateur in Covina, California.

In his teenage years, Pacino was known as "Sonny" to his friends. He had ambitions to become a baseball player and was also nicknamed "The Actor". He attended Herman Ridder Junior High School, but soon dropped out of most of his classes except for English. He subsequently attended the High School of Performing Arts, after gaining admission by audition.
His mother disagreed with his decision and, after an argument, he left home. To finance his acting studies, Pacino took low-paying jobs as a messenger, busboy, janitor, and postal clerk, as well as once working in the mailroom for Commentary.

Pacino began smoking and drinking at age nine, and used marijuana casually at age 13, but he abstained from hard drugs. His two closest friends died from drug abuse at the ages of 19 and 30. Growing up in the South Bronx, Pacino got into occasional fights and was considered somewhat of a troublemaker at school. He acted in basement plays in New York's theatrical underground but was rejected as a teenager by the Actors Studio. Pacino joined the HB Studio, where he met acting teacher Charlie Laughton, who became his mentor and best friend. In this period, he was often unemployed and homeless, and sometimes slept on the street, in theaters, or at friends' houses.

In 1962, Pacino's mother died at the age of 43. The following year, his maternal grandfather also died. Pacino recalled it as the lowest point of his life and said, "I was 22 and the two most influential people in my life had gone, so that sent me into a tailspin."

After four years at HB Studio, Pacino successfully auditioned for the Actors Studio. The Actors Studio is a membership organization of professional actors, theater directors, and playwrights in the Hell's Kitchen neighborhood of Manhattan. Pacino studied "method acting" under acting coach Lee Strasberg, who appeared with Pacino in the films The Godfather Part II and in ...And Justice for All.

During later interviews he spoke about Strasberg and the Studio's effect on his career. "The Actors Studio meant so much to me in my life. Lee Strasberg hasn't been given the credit he deserves … Next to Charlie, it sort of launched me. It really did. That was a remarkable turning point in my life. It was directly responsible for getting me to quit all those jobs and just stay acting." In another interview he added, "It was exciting to work for him [Lee Strasberg] because he was so interesting when he talked about a scene or talked about people. One would just want to hear him talk, because things he would say, you'd never heard before … He had such a great understanding … he loved actors so much."

In 2000, Pacino was co-president, along with Ellen Burstyn and Harvey Keitel, of the Actors Studio.

Stage career 

In 1967, Pacino spent a season at the Charles Playhouse in Boston, performing in Clifford Odets' Awake and Sing! (his first major paycheck:  US$125 a week); and in Jean-Claude Van Itallie's America Hurrah. He met actress Jill Clayburgh on this play. They had a five-year romance and moved back together to New York City.

In 1968, Pacino starred in Israel Horovitz's The Indian Wants the Bronx at the Astor Place Theatre, playing Murph, a street punk. The play opened January 17, 1968, and ran for 177 performances; it was staged in a double bill with Horovitz's It's Called the Sugar Plum, starring Clayburgh. Pacino won an Obie Award for Best Actor for his role, with John Cazale winning for Best Supporting Actor and Horowitz for Best New Play. Martin Bregman saw the play and became Pacino's manager, a partnership that became fruitful in the years to come, as Bregman encouraged Pacino to do The Godfather, Serpico, and Dog Day Afternoon. About his stage career, Pacino said, "Martin Bregman discovered me ... I was 26, 25 ... he discovered me and became my manager. And that's why I'm here. I owe it to Marty, I really do".

Pacino took the production of The Indian Wants the Bronx to Italy for a performance at the Festival dei Due Mondi in Spoleto. It was Pacino's first journey to Italy; he later recalled that "performing for an Italian audience was a marvelous experience". Pacino and Clayburgh were cast in "Deadly Circle of Violence", an episode of the ABC television series NYPD, premiering November 12, 1968. Clayburgh at the time was also appearing on the soap opera Search for Tomorrow, playing the role of Grace Bolton. Her father would send the couple money each month to help with finances.

On February 25, 1969, Pacino made his Broadway debut in Don Petersen's Does a Tiger Wear a Necktie? at the Belasco Theater, produced by A&P Heir Huntington Hartford. It closed after 39 performances on March 29, 1969, but Pacino received rave reviews and won the Tony Award on April 20, 1969. Pacino continued performing onstage in the 1970s, winning a second Tony Award for The Basic Training of Pavlo Hummel and performing the title role in Richard III. In the 1980s, Pacino again achieved critical success on stage while appearing in David Mamet's American Buffalo, for which Pacino was nominated for a Drama Desk Award. Since 1990, Pacino's stage work has included revivals of Eugene O'Neill's Hughie, Oscar Wilde's Salome and in 2005 Lyle Kessler's Orphans.

In 1983, Pacino became a major donor for The Mirror Theater Ltd, alongside Dustin Hoffman and Paul Newman, matching a grant from Laurence Rockefeller.  The men were inspired to invest by their connection with Lee Strasberg, as Strasberg's daughter-in-law Sabra Jones was the founder and Producing Artistic Director of The Mirror. In 1985, Pacino offered the company his production of Hughie by Eugene O'Neill, but the company was unable to do it at the time due to the small cast.

In October 2002, Pacino starred in Bertolt Brecht's The Resistible Rise of Arturo Ui for the National Actor's Theater and Complicite. Directed by Simon McBurney, the production starred a host of Hollywood names, including John Goodman, Charles Durning, Tony Randall, Steve Buscemi, Chazz Palminteri, Paul Giamatti, Jacqueline McKenzie, Billy Crudup, Lothaire Bluteau, Dominic Chianese and Sterling K. Brown. The production was a critical success in which "Pacino grabs and holds the attention like a coiled spring about to snap. He is all brooding menace and crocodile grimace, butchering his way to the top with unnervingly sinister glee."

Pacino returned to the stage in the summer of 2010, playing Shylock in the Shakespeare in the Park production, The Merchant of Venice. The acclaimed production moved to Broadway at the Broadhurst Theatre in October, earning US$1 million at the box office in its first week. The performance also garnered him a Tony Award nomination for Best Leading Actor in a Play.

Pacino starred in the 30th-anniversary Broadway revival of David Mamet's play, Glengarry Glen Ross, which ran from October 2012 to January 20, 2013. He starred on Broadway in China Doll, a play written for him by Mamet, which opened on December 5, 2015, and closed on January 21, 2016, after 97 performances. The previews were done in October 2015.

Screen career 
Pacino found acting enjoyable and realized he had a gift for it while studying at The Actors Studio. However, his early work was not financially rewarding. After his success on stage, Pacino made his film debut in 1969 with a brief appearance in Me, Natalie, an independent film starring Patty Duke. In 1970, Pacino signed with the talent agency Creative Management Associates (CMA).

1970s 

His role as a heroin addict in The Panic in Needle Park (1971) brought Pacino to the attention of director Francis Ford Coppola, who cast him as Michael Corleone in what became a blockbuster Mafia film, The Godfather (1972). Although Jack Nicholson, Robert Redford, Warren Beatty, and the little-known Robert De Niro were tried out for the part, Coppola selected Pacino, to the dismay of studio executives who wanted someone better known.

Pacino's performance earned him an Academy Award nomination, and offered a prime example of his early acting style, described by Halliwell's Film Guide as "intense" and "tightly clenched". Pacino boycotted the Academy Award ceremony, insulted at being nominated for the Supporting Acting award, as he noted that he had more screen time than co-star and Best Actor winner Marlon Brandowho also boycotted the awards, but for unrelated reasons.

In 1973, Pacino co-starred in Scarecrow, with Gene Hackman, and won the Palme d'Or at the Cannes Film Festival. That same year, Pacino was nominated for an Academy Award for Best Actor after starring in Serpico, based on the true story of New York City policeman Frank Serpico, who went undercover to expose the corruption of fellow officers. In 1974, Pacino reprised his role as Michael Corleone in The Godfather Part II, which was the first sequel to win the Best Picture Oscar; Pacino was nominated a third time for an Oscar, this second nomination for the Corleone role being in the lead category. Newsweek has described his performance in The Godfather Part II as "arguably cinema's greatest portrayal of the hardening of a heart".

In 1975, he enjoyed further success with the release of Dog Day Afternoon, based on the true story of bank robber John Wojtowicz. It was directed by Sidney Lumet, who had directed him in Serpico a few years earlier, and Pacino was again nominated for Best Actor.

In 1977, Pacino starred as a race-car driver in Bobby Deerfield, directed by Sydney Pollack, and received a Golden Globe nomination for Best Actor – Motion Picture Drama for his portrayal of the title role. His next film was the courtroom drama ...And Justice for All. Pacino was lauded by critics for his wide range of acting abilities, and nominated for the Best Actor Oscar for a fourth time. He lost out that year to Dustin Hoffman in Kramer vs. Kramer—a role that Pacino had declined.

During the 1970s, Pacino had four Oscar nominations for Best Actor, for his performances in Serpico, The Godfather Part II, Dog Day Afternoon, and ...And Justice for All.

1980s 

Pacino's career slumped in the early 1980s; his appearances in the controversial Cruising, a film that provoked protests from New York's gay community, and the comedy-drama Author! Author!, were critically panned.
However, his performance in Scarface (1983), directed by Brian De Palma, proved to be a career highlight and a defining role. Upon its initial release, the film was critically panned due to violent content, but later received critical acclaim. The film did well at the box office, grossing over US$45 million domestically. Pacino earned a Golden Globe nomination for his role as Cuban drug lord Tony Montana.

In 1985, Pacino worked on his personal project, The Local Stigmatic, a 1969 off-Broadway play by the English writer Heathcote Williams. He starred in the play, remounting it with director David Wheeler and the Theater Company of Boston in a 50-minute film version. The film was not released theatrically, but was later released as part of the Pacino: An Actor's Vision box set in 2007.

His 1985 film Revolution about a fur trapper during the American Revolutionary War, was a commercial and critical failure, which Pacino blamed on a rushed production, resulting in a four-year hiatus from films. At this time Pacino returned to the stage. He mounted workshop productions of Crystal Clear, National Anthems and other plays; he appeared in Julius Caesar in 1988 in producer Joseph Papp's New York Shakespeare Festival. Pacino remarked on his hiatus from film: "I remember back when everything was happening, '74, '75, doing The Resistible Rise of Arturo Ui on stage and reading that the reason I'd gone back to the stage was that my movie career was waning! That's been the kind of ethos, the way in which theater's perceived, unfortunately." Pacino returned to film in 1989's Sea of Love, when he portrayed a detective hunting a serial killer who finds victims through the singles column in a newspaper. The film earned solid reviews.

1990s 
Pacino received an Academy Award nomination for playing Big Boy Caprice in the box office hit Dick Tracy in 1990, of which critic Roger Ebert described Pacino as "the scene-stealer". Later in the year he followed this up in a return to one of his most famous characters, Michael Corleone, in The Godfather Part III (1990). The film received mixed reviews, and had problems in pre-production due to script rewrites and the withdrawal of actors shortly before production.

In 1991, Pacino starred in Frankie and Johnny with Michelle Pfeiffer, who co-starred with Pacino in Scarface. Pacino portrays a recently paroled cook who begins a relationship with a waitress (Pfeiffer) in the diner where they work. It was adapted by Terrence McNally from his own off-Broadway play Frankie and Johnny in the Clair de Lune (1987), that featured Kenneth Welsh and Kathy Bates. The film received mixed reviews, although Pacino later said he enjoyed playing the part. Janet Maslin in The New York Times wrote, "Mr. Pacino has not been this uncomplicatedly appealing since his Dog Day Afternoon days, and he makes Johnny's endless enterprise in wooing Frankie a delight. His scenes alone with Ms. Pfeiffer have a precision and honesty that keep the film's maudlin aspects at bay."

For his portrayal of the irascible, blind U.S. Army Lieutenant Colonel Frank Slade in Martin Brest's Scent of a Woman (1992). Pacino won the Academy Award for Best Actor next year. Following year, he was also nominated for Best Supporting Actor for Glengarry Glen Ross, making Pacino the first male actor ever to receive two acting nominations for two movies in the same year, and to win for the lead role.

Pacino starred alongside Sean Penn in the crime drama Carlito's Way in 1993, in which he portrayed Carlito Brigante, a gangster released from prison with the help of his corrupt lawyer (Penn) and vows to go straight. Pacino starred in Michael Mann's Heat (1995), in which he and Robert De Niro appeared on-screen together for the first time (though both Pacino and De Niro starred in The Godfather Part II, they did not share any scenes).

In 1996, Pacino starred in his theatrical docudrama Looking for Richard, a performance of selected scenes of William Shakespeare's Richard III and a broader examination of Shakespeare's continuing role and relevance in popular culture. The cast brought together for the performance included Alec Baldwin, Kevin Spacey, and Winona Ryder. Pacino played Satan in the supernatural thriller The Devil's Advocate (1997) which co-starred Keanu Reeves. The film was a success at the box office, taking US$150 million worldwide. Roger Ebert wrote in the Chicago Sun-Times, "The satanic character is played by Pacino with relish bordering on glee."

In 1997's Donnie Brasco, Pacino played gangster "Lefty" in the true story of undercover FBI agent Donnie Brasco (Johnny Depp) and his work in bringing down the Mafia from the inside. In 1999, Pacino starred as 60 Minutes producer Lowell Bergman in the multi-Oscar nominated The Insider opposite Russell Crowe, and in Oliver Stone's Any Given Sunday.

2000s 
Pacino won three Golden Globes since 2000; the first being the Cecil B. DeMille Award in 2001 for lifetime achievement in motion pictures.

In 2000, Pacino starred alongside Jerry Orbach in a low-budget film adaptation of Ira Lewis' play Chinese Coffee, which was released to film festivals. Shot almost exclusively as a one-on-one conversation between two main characters, the project took nearly three years to complete and was funded entirely by Pacino. Chinese Coffee was included with Pacino's two other rare films he was involved in producing, The Local Stigmatic and Looking for Richard, on a special DVD box set titled Pacino: An Actor's Vision, which was released in 2007. Pacino produced prologues and epilogues for the discs containing the films.

Pacino turned down an offer to reprise his role as Michael Corleone in the computer game version of The Godfather. As a result, Electronic Arts was not permitted to use Pacino's likeness or voice in the game, although his character does appear in it. He did allow his likeness to appear in the video game adaptation of 1983's Scarface, the quasi-sequel Scarface: The World is Yours.

Director Christopher Nolan worked with Pacino on Insomnia, a remake of the Norwegian film of the same name, co-starring Robin Williams. Newsweek stated that "he [Pacino] can play small as rivetingly as he can play big, that he can implode as well as explode". The film and Pacino's performance were well received, gaining a favorable rating of 93 percent on the review aggregation website Rotten Tomatoes. The film did moderately well at the box office, taking in $113 million worldwide. His next film, S1m0ne, however, did not receive much critical praise or box office success.

He played a publicist in People I Know, a small film that received little attention despite Pacino's well-received performance. Rarely taking a supporting role since his commercial breakthrough, he accepted a small part in the critical and box office flop Gigli, in 2003, as a favor to director Martin Brest. The Recruit, released in 2003, featured Pacino as a CIA recruiter and co-stars Colin Farrell. The film received mixed reviews, and has been described by Pacino as something he "personally couldn't follow". Pacino next starred as lawyer Roy Cohn in the 2003 HBO miniseries Angels in America, an adaptation of Tony Kushner's Pulitzer Prize winning play of the same name. For this performance, Pacino won his third Golden Globe, for Best Performance by an Actor, in 2004.

Pacino starred as Shylock in Michael Radford's 2004 film adaptation of The Merchant of Venice. Critcs praised him for bringing compassion and depth to a character traditionally played as a villainous caricature. In Two for the Money, Pacino portrays a sports gambling agent and mentor for Matthew McConaughey, alongside Rene Russo. The film was released on October 8, 2005, to mixed reviews. Desson Thomson wrote in The Washington Post, "Al Pacino has played the mentor so many times, he ought to get a kingmaker's award … the fight between good and evil feels fixed in favor of Hollywood redemption."

On October 20, 2006, the American Film Institute named Pacino the recipient of the 35th AFI Life Achievement Award. On November 22, 2006, the University Philosophical Society of Trinity College Dublin awarded Pacino the Honorary Patronage of the Society.

Pacino starred in Steven Soderbergh's Ocean's Thirteen, alongside George Clooney, Brad Pitt, Matt Damon, Elliott Gould and Andy García, as the villain Willy Bank, a casino tycoon targeted by Danny Ocean and his crew. The film received generally favorable reviews.

88 Minutes was released on April 18, 2008, in the United States, after having been released in various other countries in 2007. The film co-starred Alicia Witt and was critically panned, although critics found fault with the plot, and not Pacino's acting. In Righteous Kill, Pacino and Robert De Niro co-star as New York detectives searching for a serial killer. The film was released to theaters on September 12, 2008. While it was an anticipated return for the two stars, it was not well received by critics. Lou Lumenick of the New York Post gave Righteous Kill one star out of four, saying: "Al Pacino and Robert De Niro collect bloated paychecks with intent to bore in Righteous Kill, a slow-moving, ridiculous police thriller that would have been shipped straight to the remainder bin at Blockbuster if it starred anyone else."

2010s 
Pacino played Jack Kevorkian in an HBO Films biopic titled You Don't Know Jack, which premiered April 2010. The film is about the life and work of the physician-assisted suicide advocate. The performance earned Pacino his second Emmy Award for lead actor and his fourth Golden Globe award. He co-starred as himself in the 2011 comedy film Jack and Jill. The film was panned by critics, and Pacino "won" the Golden Raspberry Award for Worst Supporting Actor at the 32nd ceremony.

He was presented with Jaeger-LeCoultre Glory to the Filmmaker Award on September 4, 2011, prior to the premiere of Wilde Salomé, a 2011 American documentary-drama film written, directed by and starring Pacino. Its US premiere on the evening of March 21, 2012, before a full house at the 1,400-seat Castro Theatre in San Francisco's Castro District, marked the 130th anniversary of Oscar Wilde's visit to San Francisco. The event was a benefit for the GLBT Historical Society. Pacino, who plays the role of Herod in the film, describes it as his "most personal project ever". In February 2012, President Barack Obama awarded Pacino the National Medal of Arts.

Pacino starred in a 2013 HBO biographical picture about record producer Phil Spector's murder trial, titled Phil Spector. He took the title role in the comedy-drama Danny Collins (2015). His performance as an aging rock star garnered him a Golden Globe Award for Best Actor – Motion Picture Musical or Comedy nomination. In 2016, Pacino received the Kennedy Center Honor. The tribute included remarks by his former costars Sean Penn, Kevin Spacey, Bobby Cannavale and Chris O'Donnell.

In September 2012, Deadline Hollywood reported that Pacino would play the former Penn State University football coach Joe Paterno in the television film Paterno based on a 2012 biography by sportswriter Joe Posnanski. Paterno premiered on HBO on April 7, 2018.

Pacino starred alongside Brad Pitt and Leonardo DiCaprio in Quentin Tarantino's comedy-drama Once Upon a Time in Hollywood, which was released on July 26, 2019. Later in 2019, Pacino played Teamsters chief Jimmy Hoffa, alongside Robert De Niro and Joe Pesci, in Martin Scorsese's Netflix film The Irishman, based on the 2004 book I Heard You Paint Houses by Charles Brandt; this was the first time Pacino was directed by Scorsese, and he received an Academy Award for Best Supporting Actor nomination. Pacino's performance received positive reviews. Peter Bradshaw described it as "glorious" in The Guardian. Justin Chang wrote, "De Niro, Pesci and Pacino are at the top of their game, in part because they aren't simply rehashing the iconic gangster types they've played before."

2020s 
In February 2020, Pacino starred as Meyer Offerman, a fictional Nazi hunter, in the Amazon Video series Hunters. This is Pacino's first television series since Angels in America (2003). Hunters was renewed for a second season in August 2020.

In 2021, Pacino played Aldo Gucci in Ridley Scott's House of Gucci. The film received mixed to positive reviews, with Pacino's performance being highlighted as a standout, along with Lady Gaga's and Jared Leto's. That same year, he played the lead defense attorney in American Traitor: The Trial of Axis Sally.

In August 2022, Pacino was set to produce a film about Amedeo Modigliani, which he will co-produce alongside Johnny Depp and Barry Navidi. The film is based on a play by Dennis McIntyre, which was previously adapted for the 2004 film of the same name. Principal photography will commence in 2023.

Personal life 

Pacino has three children. The eldest, Julie Marie (born 1989), is his daughter with acting coach Jan Tarrant. He has twins, son Anton James and daughter Olivia Rose (born January 25, 2001), with actress Beverly D'Angelo, with whom he had a relationship from 1997 until 2003. He has never been married.

Pacino had a relationship with his The Godfather Trilogy co-star Diane Keaton. Their on-again, off-again relationship ended after the filming of The Godfather Part III. Keaton said of Pacino, "Al was simply the most entertaining man... To me, that's, that is the most beautiful face. I think Warren [Beatty] was gorgeous, very pretty, but Al's face is like whoa. Killer, killer face." He has had relationships with Tuesday Weld, Jill Clayburgh, Marthe Keller, Kathleen Quinlan, and Lyndall Hobbs. Pacino had a ten-year relationship with Argentine actress Lucila Polak from 2008 to 2018.

Pacino has admitted to abusing drugs and alcohol early in his career, partly because he found his sudden fame after The Godfather difficult to cope with. He achieved sobriety in 1977.

Awards and nominations 

Pacino has won and been nominated for many awards during his acting career, including nine Oscar nominations (winning one), 18 Golden Globe nominations (winning four), five BAFTA nominations (winning one), two Primetime Emmy Awards for his work on television, and two Tony Awards for his stage work. In 2007, the American Film Institute awarded Pacino with a lifetime achievement award and, in 2003, British television viewers voted Pacino as the greatest film star of all time in a poll for Channel 4.

Filmography

Explanatory notes

References

Citations

General and cited references

External links 

 
 
 
 Al Pacino at the University of Wisconsin's Actors Studio audio collection
 
 
 

1940 births
Living people
20th-century American male actors
21st-century American male actors
21st-century American male writers
21st-century American screenwriters
AFI Life Achievement Award recipients
American people of Italian descent
American male film actors
American male screenwriters
American male Shakespearean actors
American male stage actors
American male television actors
American writers of Italian descent
Best Actor Academy Award winners
Best Actor BAFTA Award winners
Best Drama Actor Golden Globe (film) winners
Best Miniseries or Television Movie Actor Golden Globe winners
Cecil B. DeMille Award Golden Globe winners
David di Donatello winners
Directors Guild of America Award winners
Drama Desk Award winners
Entertainers from the Bronx
Film directors from New York City
Film producers from New York (state)
Fiorello H. LaGuardia High School alumni
Kennedy Center honorees
Male actors from New York City
Method actors
Obie Award recipients
Outstanding Performance by a Lead Actor in a Miniseries or Movie Primetime Emmy Award winners
Outstanding Performance by a Male Actor in a Miniseries or Television Movie Screen Actors Guild Award winners
People from East Harlem
Screenwriters from New York (state)
Tony Award winners
United States National Medal of Arts recipients
Writers from Manhattan
Writers from the Bronx